George Aitken Clark (1823–1873) was a Scottish manufacturer and benefactor.

Life
He was the son of John Clark, a thread manufacturer in Paisley, where he was born on 9 August 1823. He was educated at Paisley grammar school, and in 1840 was sent the firm of Kerr & Co. of Hamilton, Ontario. On reaching manhood he returned to Paisley, and entered into partnership with Messrs. Robert and John Ronald, shawlmakers, under the name of "Ronald & Clark".

In 1851 Clark gave up his partnership to go into with his brother-in-law, Robert Kerr, as a thread manufacturer. To extend the business he went in 1856 to the United States, and to avoid the tariffs the firm in 1864 established a factory at Newark, New Jersey. It was a success, and Clark's O.N.T. spool cotton soon became a recognised American brand. In 1866 the firm amalgamated with the original firm of Clark under the name of Clark & Co.,with an anchor as their trade-mark. Clark died at Newark on 13 February 1873.

Legacy

By his will Clark left £20,000 for scholarships at Glasgow University, and £20,000 to build a town hall in Paisley. The firm of Clark & Co. subscribed a further £40,000, and the building then styled the George A. Clark Town Hall was opened in 1882. The architect was William Henry Lynn.

Notes

Attribution

External links
renfrewshire.gov.uk, Paisley Town Hall.

1823 births
1873 deaths
People from Paisley, Renfrewshire
19th-century Scottish businesspeople